"Princesse" is a song by French hip hop artist Nekfeu featuring French singer Nemir. The fifteenth track from Nekfeu's debut studio album Feu, the song is produced by Nekfeu himself, as well as DJ Elite.

Despite not being released as a single, the song broke into the French Singles Chart at number 172 on 20 June 2015, peaking at that same position.

Track listing
 Digital download
 "Princesse (featuring Nemir)" – 4:26

Chart performance

References

2015 songs
Nekfeu songs
French hip hop songs
Songs written by Nekfeu